24 TV is a news channel in Turkey founded in 2007 and centrally located in Küçükçekmece.

External links 

 
 24 at LyngSat Address

Television stations in Turkey
Television channels and stations established in 2007
2007 establishments in Turkey
Mass media in Istanbul
Küçükçekmece
24-hour television news channels in Turkey